Hilal station formerly Istravoz station is a railway station located in İzmir, Turkey. It is located east of Basmane next to the famous Hilal Junction on the Izmir-Afyon railway. The station was famous for being located next to the only diamond crossing in Turkey. The Oriental Railway Company's Alsancak-Aydın Main Line crossed with the Smyrna Cassaba Railway's Basmane-Afyon Main Line. Due to the layout of the tracks, the station was first named Istravoz railway station in 1866. Istravoz (from Greek σταυρóς) means Cross in Turkish. After the Republic of Turkey was formed in 1923, the station's name was changed to Hilal which means 'crescent', due to the majority of the city's population being Muslim. The Hilal metro station, which opened in 2000, is located adjacent to the railway station. When the electrification of the tracks around İzmir started in 2001, the station was closed.

Hilal station served the Hilal neighbourhood east of Basmane.

Since early 2011 there had been talk of reopening Hilal as a second transfer point between İZBAN and İzmir Metro. On 4 August 2013, the station reopened serving IZBAN commuter trains. Two new island platforms were built and the station now lies on the Izmir-Eğirdir railway instead of the Izmir-Afyon railway.

References

Railway stations in İzmir Province
Railway stations opened in 1866
Railway stations closed in 2001
1866 establishments in the Ottoman Empire
2001 disestablishments in Turkey
Konak District